Pushacoona Creek is a stream in the U.S. state of Mississippi.

Pushacoona is a name derived from the Choctaw language purported to mean "river, watercourse, stream".

References

Rivers of Mississippi
Rivers of Kemper County, Mississippi
Mississippi placenames of Native American origin